The common big-eared bat (Micronycteris microtis) is a bat species from South and Central America. It is a member of the family Phyllostomidae.

Recent research has demonstrated this bat's ability to find motionless food within clutter. Echolocating bats discriminate between background and prey based on glints or Doppler shifts in the echo induced by the (wing-)movements of the prey, but M. microtis can detect completely motionless prey. The species shares both the leaf-nose formation and the trait of sound emission through the nostrils with all Phyllostomidae, but its behavior is understood to be unique: the bat is able to discriminate ecologically relevant stimuli within an extremely complex cluttered sonic environment.

The echolocation call of M. microtis is a broad band multi-harmonic FM sweep with most energy in the second harmonic between 95 and 75 kHz, i.e. quite similar to that of Macrophyllum macrophyllum, although presumably of lower intensity.

M. microtis mothers will provide pups with prey items for 5 months after weaning.

Description
It is a small species of bat with individuals weighing . Its ears are connected by an inter-auricular membrane. Its fur is brown, with geographic variation in the shade of brown.

Range and habitat
It is found in Belize, Bolivia, Brazil, Colombia, Costa Rica, El Salvador, French Guiana, Guatemala, Guyana, Honduras, Mexico, Nicaragua, Panama, and Venezuela

References

Micronycteris
Bats of Central America
Bats of South America
Bats of Brazil
Mammals of Colombia
Mammals described in 1898
Taxa named by Gerrit Smith Miller Jr.